Empress Wei (personal name unknown) (died July 21, 710) was an empress consort of the Chinese Tang dynasty. She was the second wife of Emperor Zhongzong, who reigned twice, and during his second reign, she tried to emulate the example of her mother-in-law Wu Zetian and seize power. She was in charge of the governmental affairs during her husband's reign. Emperor Zhongzong's death in 710—a death traditionally believed to be a poisoning she carried out together with her daughter Li Guo'er the Princess Anle—gave her the power to become the empress dowager and regent, but in short order was overthrown and killed in a coup led by Emperor Zhongzong's nephew Li Longji (the later Emperor Xuanzong) and Emperor Zhongzong's sister Princess Taiping.

First stint as crown princess
It is not known when Empress Wei was born.  During the reign of her husband's grandfather Emperor Taizong, her grandfather Wei Hongbiao (韋弘表) served as the military advisor to Emperor Taizong's son Li Ming (李明) the Prince of Cao.  When Emperor Zhongzong, then using the name Li Zhe, was crown prince, he married her as his second wife (his first wife, Princess Zhao, was starved to death when her mother Princess Changle offended Li Zhe's mother Empress Wu (later known as Wu Zetian)) and crown princess.  At the time that they were married, Li Zhe's father Emperor Gaozong promoted her father Wei Xuanzhen (韋玄貞) from being the military advisor to the prefect of Pu Prefecture (普州, roughly modern Ziyang, Sichuan) (eighth rank, second class, second division) to be the much more important post of being prefect of Yu Prefecture (豫州, roughly modern Zhumadian, Henan) (fourth rank, first class, second division).  In 682, she gave birth to their only son, Li Chongzhao.  Sometime during her stint as crown princess, she also gave birth to at least one daughter (the later Princess Changning) and possibly another (Li Xianhui, the later Princess Yongtai).

First stint as empress
Emperor Gaozong died in late 683, and Li Zhe took the throne (historically known as Emperor Zhongzong).  However, actual power was in the hands of his mother Empress Wu, now empress dowager.  In spring 684, Emperor Zhongzong made Crown Princess Wei the empress.  He soon wanted to promote Wei Xuanzhen to be Shizhong (侍中), the head of the examination bureau of government (門下省, Menxia Sheng) and a post considered one for a chancellor.  This move, as well as another wish of his—to make the son of his wet nurse an official of the fifth rank—were opposed by the chancellor Pei Yan.  As they argued, Emperor Zhongzong, in anger, remarked:

Pei, in fear, informed this to Empress Dowager Wu.  Just less than two months after Emperor Zhongzong had taken the throne, Empress Dowager Wu summoned the officials and generals and issued an edict deposing Emperor Zhongzong and reducing to the title of Prince of Luling. She instead created his younger brother Li Dan the Prince of Yu emperor (historically known as Emperor Ruizong). Li Chongzhao, who had been given the title of Deputy Crown Prince by Emperor Gaozong, was reduced to commoner rank and Wei Xuanzhen, along with his family, were exiled to Qin Prefecture (欽州, roughly modern Qinzhou, Guangxi). Empress Dowager Wu soon ordered that Li Zhe and his family first be delivered to Fang Prefecture (房州, in modern Shiyan, Hubei), and then Jun Prefecture (均州, also in modern Shiyan), to be held under house arrest at the house that his uncle Li Tai had been placed after Li Tai was deposed in 643.

In exile
Li Zhe was constantly in fear in exile, as Empress Dowager Wu had previously shown willingness to kill her own children—having forced his older brother Li Xián to commit suicide in 684 and having been rumored to have poisoned another older brother, Li Hong, in 675—and whenever there would be imperial messengers arriving from then-capital Luoyang, he would consider committing suicide, fearing that they brought orders for even worse fates.  Princess Wei would repeatedly tell him:

At this point, they were deeply in love with each other, and at another point, he told her:

While they in exile, she gave birth to their youngest daughter, Li Guo'er—whose name Guo'er meant, "child who was wrapped" and referred to how, when she was born, Li Zhe was required to take off his shirt and wrap her in the shirt.  Li Zhe and Princess Wei both greatly favored this child born in distress.

Meanwhile, while Li Zhe and Princess Wei were in exile, so were Wei Xuanzhen and his family.  After Wei Xuanzhen died soon thereafter, a local tribal chief, Ning Chengji (寧承基), demanded to marry Princess Wei's younger sister.  When Princess Wei's mother Lady Cui refused, Ning killed her and her four sons Wei Xun (韋洵), Wei Hao (韋浩), Wei Dong (韋洞), and Wei Ci (韋泚).

While Li Zhe and Princess Wei were in exile, Empress Dowager Wu had, in 690, forced Li Zhe's brother Li Dan to yield the throne to her, interrupting Tang Dynasty and establishing her own Zhou Dynasty with her as "emperor" (thereafter known as Wu Zetian).  She created the now-removed Li Dan as her crown prince, but constantly suspected him of secretly plotting against her, and in 693, she killed his wife Crown Princess Liu and concubine Consort Dou, and further investigated him for treason, stopping the investigation only when his servant, An Jinzang, cut open his own belly to swear that Li Dan would never commit treason.  She nevertheless repeatedly considered replacing him with her nephews Wu Chengsi the Prince of Wei and Wu Sansi the Prince of Liang.

By 698, however, the chancellor Di Renjie had convinced Wu Zetian that it was to her sons, not her nephews, that she should turn for support.  Di's fellow chancellors Wang Fangqing and Wang Jishan, as well as Wu Zetian's lovers Zhang Yizhi and Zhang Changzong and her confidant Ji Xu also supported the idea of summoning Li Zhe from exile.  In spring 698, Wu Zetian summoned Li Zhe and his family back to Luoyang.

Second stint as crown princess
Once Li Zhe was back in Luoyang, Li Dan offered to yield the crown prince position to his older brother, and Wu Zetian agreed.  In fall 698, she created Li Zhe crown prince and had him change his name back to the original name Li Xiǎn (note different tone than his brother) (although she soon also had him change his surname to her surname Wu—thus making him Wu Xiǎn).  Princess Wei again became crown princess.  Her son Li Chongzhao—who had by now changed his name to Li Chongrun to observe naming taboo for Wu Zetian's personal name Zhao—was created the Prince of Shao. There are many glorious state paintings of this in the forbidden city.

Meanwhile, Wu Zetian, in her old age, had entrusted much of the affairs of state to Zhang Yizhi and Zhang Changzong—something that Li Chongrun discussed with his sister Li Xianhui and her husband, Wu Zetian's grandnephew Wu Yanji (武延基) the Prince of Wei (Wu Chengsi's son) at times.  Zhang Yizhi found out and informed Wu Zetian.  Wu Zetian, believing that she was being criticized, in fall 701, ordered Li Chongrun, Li Xianhui, and Wu Yanji to commit suicide.  Li Chongrun's death would leave Crown Princess Wei without a son, as his other sons Li Chongfu, Li Chongjun, and Li Chongmao were all born of concubines.

In spring 705, with Wu Zetian being ill, the officials Zhang Jianzhi, Cui Xuanwei, Jing Hui, Huan Yanfan, and Yuan Shuji initiated a coup and killed Zhang Yizhi and Zhang Changzong.  They forced Wu Zetian to yield the throne back to Wu Xiǎn, and he returned to the throne, restoring Tang Dynasty.  He created Crown Princess Wei empress again.  He also posthumously honored her father Wei Xuanzhen as the Prince of Shangluo and her mother Lady Cui as the Princess of Shangluo, reburying them in grand ceremonies.  In addition, he posthumously honored Li Chongrun as Crown Prince Yide and Li Xianhui as Princess Yongtai, reburying them with ceremonies due emperors.

Second stint as empress
After the reappearance of the emperor Zhongzong, Empress Wei was able to seize power and quickly became highly extremely powerful and influential, and like Empress Wu in the time of Emperor Gaozong, who sat behind the curtain behind the throne and decided on important matters, Empress Wei followed the same pattern in the time of Emperor Zhongzong. According to Song dynasty historian Sīmǎ Guāng 司马光 in the Zizhi Tongjian:  Huan Yanfan complained to the emperor about the empress's involvement in politics and participation in the court: 
Zhang Jianzhi and his colleagues next wanted to suppress the power of that the Wu clan princes had, but at this time, Emperor Zhongzong's concubine Consort Shangguan Wan'er, who had been Wu Zetian's secretary and who had carried on an affair with Wu Zetian's nephew Wu Sansi, helped kindle an affair between Wu Sansi and Empress Wei as well.  (Emperor Zhongzong was either unaware of, or implicitly approved of, the affair.)  Wu Sansi became a trusted advisor of Emperor Zhongzong. So a Wu and Wei dictatorship group headed by Empress Wei, who controlled the government. Meanwhile, Empress Wei disliked her husband's son Li Chongfu the Prince of Qiao (whose wife was Zhang's niece), and falsely accused him of being implicit in Li Chongrun's death; Emperor Zhongzong responded by exiling Li Chongfu to Jun Prefecture to serve as prefect.  It was said that both Empress Wei and her daughter Li Guo'er (now with the title Princess Anle and who married Wu Sansi's son Wu Chongxun (武崇訓)) were very powerful and corrupt, offering offices for sale and influencing legal decisions.  it was even said that Li Guo'er often wrote edicts in Emperor Zhongzong's name, and then covered up the contents and had him sign them—and that he would do so despite not reading the edicts.  She also requested to be made his heir, as crown princess—which would be an unprecedented act in Chinese history, although he declined and created her brother Li Chongjun crown prince instead. Zhang Jianzhi saw that it was impossible to persuade Emperor Zhongzong to kill Wu Sansi, so he took the next step and wanted to suppress it from power, so he wrote to Emperor Zhongzong and said:  

Wu Sansi and Empress Wei, who despised Zhang and his colleagues, accused them of being overly arrogant in light of their achievements, and at Wu Sansi's suggestion, Emperor Zhongzong made Zhang, Jing Hui, Huan Yanfan, Yuan Shuji, and Cui Xuanwei princes, ostensibly to honor them, but instead intending to remove them from positions of power.  (Emperor Zhongzong, for reasons unclear, also bestowed the surname of Wei on Huan, "honoring" him by merging his clan with Empress Wei's.)  Soon, the five princes were made prefectural prefects and sent out of Luoyang. 

In spring 706, after Emperor Zhongzong's son-in-law Wang Tongjiao (王同皎), who despised Empress Wei and Wu Sansi, was accused of plotting to kill them, Empress Wei and Wu Sansi took this opportunity to implicate Jing, Cui, Huan (whose Wei surname was then stripped), Yuan, and Zhang, of being involved in the plot, and had them further reduced to be prefectural military advisors in distant prefects.  Wu Sansi then intentionally inflamed Emperor Zhongzong by having people publicly accuse Empress Wei of adultery and then accusing the five princes of this.  Emperor Zhongzong responded by ordering the five of them permanently exiled; Wu then sent the official Zhou Lizhen (周利貞) to have the five of them killed cruelly (although Zhang and Cui were already dead by the time that Zhou reached them).

Meanwhile, to avenge her mother's and brothers' deaths, Empress Wei had Emperor Zhongzong order Zhou Rengui (周仁軌), the commandant at Guang Prefecture (廣州, roughly modern Guangzhou, Guangdong), to attack Ning Chengji and his brothers; Zhou defeated Ning and slaughtered his people.  In gratitude, Empress Wei bowed to Zhou, honoring him like a father, and Emperor Zhongzong created Zhou the Duke of Ru'nan.

Despite Li Chongjun's status as crown prince, Li Guo'er and her husband Wu Chongxun often humiliated and harassed him, sometimes referring to him as a slave.  Further, Li Guo'er was continuing to try to persuade Emperor Zhongzong to depose Li Chongjun and create her crown princess instead.  Li Chongjun finally erupted in anger in fall 707, rising with the ethnically Mohe general Li Duozuo and Emperor Zhongzong's cousin Li Qianli (李千里) the Prince of Cheng.  Li Chongjun's forces killed Wu Sansi and Wu Chengxu, and next headed to the palace, hoping to capture Consort Shangguan and Empress Wei.  However, after Li Duozuo's son-in-law Ye Huli (野呼利) was killed by the eunuch guard commander Yang Sixu (楊思勗), Li Chongjun's army collapsed, and he was soon killed by his own subordinates.  (Li Guo'er soon married Wu Chengxun's cousin Wu Yanxiu (武延秀).) Although Wu Sansi died, but Empress Wei's power was even stronger. At that time, the empire was not stable, and there were many disasters of floods and droughts. Empress Wei and her group were only keen to suppress opposing forces, cultivate cronies, and cause chaos in the government, and as always, they did not pay attention to the efficient administration of the empire.

It was said by 708, Empress Wei, Li Guo'er, Empress Wei's other daughter Princess Changning, Consort Shangguan, Empress Wei's sister Lady of Cheng, Consort Shangguan's mother Lady Zheng, along with senior ladies in waiting Ladies Chai and Helou, the sorceress Diwu Ying'er (第五英兒), and Lady Zhao of Longxi, were all powerful and corrupt, selling offices at will.  They, along with Emperor Zhongzong's sister Princess Taiping, were often involved in partisan struggles, a phenomenon that Emperor Zhongzong was concerned about, but could do little to curb.  Empress Wei's power was such that the emperor did not even dare to make decisions without her opinion and in around the new year 709, when Emperor Zhongzong offered to have her old wet nurse Lady Wang marry the widower chancellor Dou Chongyi, Dou, seeing the opportunity for even more power, gleefully agreed notwithstanding Lady Wang's otherwise low status.  Meanwhile, Empress Wei and the Princesses Changning and Anle were also building many Buddhist temples.

By fall 710, it was said that Empress Wei had been having affairs with the officials Ma Qinke (馬秦客) and Yang Jun (楊均), and Ma and Yang were concerned that if the affairs became known they would be killed.  Meanwhile, Li Guo'er hoped that if Empress Wei became the sovereign she would be crown princess.  They conspired to poison a cake, and after Emperor Zhongzong ate the cake, he died, on July 3, 710.  Empress Wei did not initially announce his death, but instead a number of her cousins in charge of the imperial guards, to secure power, before she announced Emperor Zhongzong's death two days after his death.  By an edict that Princess Taiping and Consort Shangguan drafted (and later revised by Empress Wei's cousin Wei Wen), Emperor Zhongzong's son Li Chongmao the Prince of Wen was created crown prince, and Li Chongmao then took the throne (as Emperor Shang) on July 8.  Empress Wei retained power as empress dowager.

As empress dowager and regent
Meanwhile, Empress Dowager Wei's clan members, along with the chancellor Zong Chuke, Wu Yanxiu, and other officials Zhao Lüwen (趙履溫) and Ye Jingneng (葉靜能) were advising her to take the throne, like Wu Zetian did, and they also advised her to eliminate Li Dan and Princess Taiping.  The official Cui Riyong leaked their plan to Li Dan's son Li Longji the Prince of Linzi.  Li Longji responded by conspiring with Princess Taiping, Princess Taiping's son Xue Chongjian (薛崇簡), as well as several low level officials close to him—Zhong Shaojing, Wang Chongye (王崇曄), Liu Youqiu, and Ma Sizong (麻嗣宗)—to act first.  Meanwhile, Empress Wei's nephews Wei Bo (韋播) and Gao Song (高嵩), who had recently been put in command of imperial guards and who had tried to establish their authority by dealing with the guards harshly, had alienated the guards, and the guard officers Ge Fushun (葛福順), Chen Xuanli (陳玄禮), and Li Xianfu (李仙鳧) thereafter also joined the plot.

Without first informing Li Dan, the conspirators rose on July 21, first killing Wei Bo, Gao, and Empress Wei's cousin Wei Xuan (韋璿).  They then attacked the palace.  When Empress Dowager Wei panicked and fled to an imperial guard camp, a guard beheaded her.  Li Guo'er, Wu Yanxiu, and Lady Helou were killed as well.  Li Longji soon slaughtered a number of officials in Empress Dowager's faction as well as her clan, while displaying Empress Dowager Wei's body on the street.  At the urging of Princess Taiping, Li Longji, and Li Longji's brother Li Chengqi, Li Dan soon took the throne from Li Chongmao and again became emperor (as Emperor Ruizong).  Empress Dowager Wei was posthumously reduced to commoner rank. Emperor Ruizong still buried her with honors (so some historians refer this as an evidence that she never poisoned Zhongzong), but not with honors due an empress, rather with honors due an official of the first rank.

In fiction and popular culture
 Portrayed by Michelle Yim in Deep in the Realm of Conscience (2018).

 Portrayed by Claire Yiu in The Greatness of a Hero (2009)

 Portrayed by Jia Ni and Hu Jing in Palace of Desire (2000).

 Portrayed by Lily Li in The Blood Hounds (1990).

See also 
 Women of the Tang Dynasty

Notes and references

 Old Book of Tang, vol. 51.
 New Book of Tang, 76.
 Zizhi Tongjian, vols. 203, 208, 209.

Tang dynasty empresses
Tang dynasty Buddhists
Regents of China
8th-century women rulers
7th-century births
710 deaths
8th-century rulers in Asia
Tang dynasty empresses dowager
Wei clan of Jingzhao
7th-century Chinese women
7th-century Chinese people
8th-century Chinese women
8th-century Chinese people
8th-century Chinese monarchs